Athenagoras I, born Aristocles Matthaiou ("son of Matthew", a patronymic) Spyrou (– July 7, 1972), initially the Greek archbishop in North America, was the 268th Ecumenical Patriarch of Constantinople, from 1948 to 1972.

Biography

He has been described as having been of Aromanian, Albanian, or Greek descent. Athenagoras was the son of Matthew N. Spyrou, a doctor, and Helen V. Mokoros. Athenagoras devoted himself to religion at an early age because of the encouragement he received from his mother and a priest from his village. After completing his secondary education in 1906, he entered the Holy Trinity Theological School at Halki, near Istanbul, and was ordained a deacon in 1910.

Upon graduating, he was tonsured a monk, given the name Athenagoras, and ordained to the diaconate. He served as archdeacon of the Diocese of Pelagonia before becoming the secretary to Archbishop Meletius (Metaxakis) of Athens in 1919. While still a deacon, he was elected the Metropolitan of Corfu in 1922 and straightway raised to the episcopacy.

Returning from a fact-finding trip to the Greek Orthodox Archdiocese in America in 1930, Metropolitan Damaskinos recommended to Patriarch Photios II that he appoint Metropolitan Athenagoras to the position of Archbishop of North and South America as the best person to bring harmony to the American diocese. The patriarch made the appointment on August 30, 1930.

When Archbishop Athenagoras assumed his new position on February 24, 1931, he was faced with the task of bringing unity and harmony to a diocese that was racked with dissension between Royalists and Republicans (Venizelists), who had virtually divided the country into separate dioceses. To correct that, he centralized the ecclesiastical administration in the archdiocese offices with all other bishops serving as auxiliaries, appointed to assist the archbishop, without dioceses and administrative rights of their own. He actively worked with his communities to establish harmony. He expanded the work of the clergy-laity congresses and founded the Holy Cross School of Theology. Through his capable and fatherly leadership he withstood early opposition and gained the love and devotion of his people.

Archbishop Athenagoras consecrated the Archdiocesan Cathedral of the Holy Trinity on New York City's Upper East Side on October 22, 1933. He called it: "The Cathedral of all of Hellenism in America."

In 1938, Athenagoras was naturalized as a United States citizen.

On November 1, 1948, he was elected Patriarch of Constantinople at the age of 62. In January 1949, he was honored to be flown in the personal airplane of the American president Harry Truman to Istanbul, Turkey to assume his new position. As Patriarch, he was actively involved with the World Council of Churches and improving relations with the Catholic Church and the Pope.

He was hospitalized on July 6, 1972, for a broken hip, but died from kidney failure in Istanbul (Constantinople) the following day at the age of 86. He was buried in the cemetery within the grounds of the Church of Saint Mary of the Spring in Balıklı, Istanbul.

Ecumenical relations

Athenagoras's meeting with Pope Paul VI in 1964 in Jerusalem led to rescinding the excommunications of 1054 which historically mark the Great Schism, the schism between the churches of the East and West. This was a significant step towards restoring communion between Rome and Constantinople and the other patriarchates of Orthodoxy. It produced the Catholic–Orthodox Joint Declaration of 1965, which was read out on December 7, 1965, simultaneously at a public meeting of the Second Vatican Council in Rome and at a special ceremony in Constantinople.

The controversial declaration did not end the 1054 schism, but rather showed a desire for greater reconciliation between the two churches, as represented by Pope Paul VI and Ecumenical Patriarch Athenagoras I. Not all Orthodox leaders, however, received the declaration with joy. In his 1965 epistle to the Patriarch, Metropolitan Philaret of the Russian Orthodox Church Abroad openly challenged the Patriarch's efforts at rapprochement with the Catholic Church fearing it would lead to heresy.

References

Citations

Sources

External links

OrthodoxWiki – Athenagoras I (Spyrou) of Constantinople
Joint Catholic-Orthodox Declaration of his Holiness Pope Paul VI and the Ecumenical Patriarch Athenagoras I
A Protest to Patriarch Athenagoras: On the Lifting of the Anathemas of 1054
Common Declaration of Pope Paul VI and the Ecumenical Patriarch Athenagoras I (28 October 1967)
Remembering Patriarch Athenagoras

Athenagoras, Patriarch
Athenagoras, Patriarch
People from Janina vilayet
Aromanians from the Ottoman Empire
Greek people of Aromanian descent
Albanians from the Ottoman Empire
Greek people of Albanian descent
Greek anti-communists
20th-century Ecumenical Patriarchs of Constantinople
Archbishops of the Greek Orthodox Archdiocese of America
Eastern Orthodox Christians from Greece
Members of the Church of Greece
Theological School of Halki alumni
Greek Orthodox bishops of Corfu
People from Ioannina (regional unit)
Greek expatriate bishops